Lizard Mound State Park is a state park in the Town of Farmington, Washington County, Wisconsin near the city of West Bend. Established in 1950, it was acquired by Washington County from the state of Wisconsin in 1986. It contains a significant well-preserved effigy mound group.

Mounds in the park are listed on the National Register of Historic Places, identified as "47Wt1". Also included in the listing are the Glass Mounds, identified as 47Wt199.

Washington County re-deeded the park to the Wisconsin Department of Natural Resources in October 2021. The DNR designated the park as a Wisconsin state park in 2022.

Information
Lizard Mound State Park is located in the Town of Farmington, north of West Bend, Wisconsin on County Trunk "A", one mile east of State Highway 144. Established in 1950, the park was acquired by Washington County from the State of Wisconsin in 1986. The park contains 28 effigy mounds in an excellent state of preservation, reputedly one of the best effigy mound groups remaining in Wisconsin. A self-guided anthropological nature trail winds around the park. Trail markers reveal information about the extinct culture that built the mounds. An unusually beautiful group of mounds, each is of prominent height and careful construction. Most of the mounds rise more than three feet above the ground surface. The variety of mound shapes found in the park is considered unusual. Two are large bird effigy mounds and seven are long-tailed animal forms. These long-tailed effigies are usually referred to as "panther" effigies. One of the 28 mounds is named "Lizard Mound". This mound might have been intended to represent the same animal, whether a panther or something else, but in a spread eagle posture that shows all four limbs.

History
The Mound Builders lived in Wisconsin and bordering states between A.D. 500 and A.D. 1000. They survived by hunting, fishing, and gathering wild plants. They moved from place to place often. In the summer they could be found closer to rivers and lakes, while in the winter they moved into sheltered upland valleys. They built burial and effigy mounds shaped like mammals, reptiles, birds and other creatures, both real and mythical. They also constructed conical, oval and linear mounds. The effigy mound builders usually buried their dead in small pits or laid them on carefully prepared surfaces. The mounds were then built over them like grave markers. The custom of building effigy burial mounds died out about 1000 years ago; it was a custom unique to the general area. Little else is known about the Mound Builders. Even Indians who lived in Wisconsin when the first white men arrived didn't know why, or by whom, the mounds had been built.

The earliest data concerning the mounds in the area of Lizard Mound State Park was in the form of a sketch map resulting from field investigations made by Professor Julius L. Torney of Milwaukee in 1883. In his sketch of the mound group, Torney illustrated a total of 47 Indian mounds. He also indicated that a number of the earthworks had been destroyed prior to the time that he drew his map. The original group probably consisted of at least 60 mounds, including many of the well known effigy shapes.

Archeological explorations conducted in 1960 revealed that the dead were placed in pits, with the effigy mounds built over the pits. Artifacts such as clay pots, projectile points, pipes, bone harpoons and beads were sometimes placed with the dead. It has been speculated that the shapes of the mounds had a religious or clan significance, but no one knows for sure.

Excavations of Effigy Mound Builders' village sites indicated they lived in small nomadic groups, hunted, fished, gathered fruits and nuts, fashioned tools of stone, wood, bone and copper, made pottery and may have been the first people in Wisconsin to use the bow and arrow.

No other group of mounds in Wisconsin is so well preserved, so diverse in form, or exhibits such outstanding examples of the prehistoric art of mound construction.

See also
List of burial mounds in the United States

Notes

Archaeological sites on the National Register of Historic Places in Wisconsin
Mounds in Wisconsin
Native American history of Wisconsin
Protected areas of Washington County, Wisconsin
Parks on the National Register of Historic Places in Wisconsin
Historic districts on the National Register of Historic Places in Wisconsin
National Register of Historic Places in Washington County, Wisconsin
State parks of Wisconsin